Pindori Kalan is a small village located in Wazirabad Tehsil, Gujranwala District, Punjab, Pakistan.

Demography 
Pindori Kalan has a population of over 3700 and is located about 26 kilometres northwest of Gujranwala city. For cargo delivery Pakistan Post is active in village. Village has all basic facilities else government hospital and natural gas.

Education 
For education in the village a Government Schools are functional by Government of Punjab, Pakistan under Board of Intermediate and Secondary Education, Gujranwala. For higher-level education some student move to Kalaske Cheema and some Ahmad Nagar Chattha, for higher university level education people move to Gujranwala and Gujrat, Pakistan. While some private institute also functions in the area.

 Government Boys Primary School (GPS), Pindori Kalan

Communication 
The only way to get Pindori Kalan is by road. Pindori Kalan is directly connected with Kalaske Cheema. Besides driving your own car (which takes about 45 minutes from Gujranwala, 25 minutes from Ali Pur Chatta). The Wazirabad-Faisalabad rail link is the only nearest railway line and Rasool Nagar is the nearest railway station.

See also 

 Bega Khurd
 Bega Kalan
 Dharam Kot

References 

Villages in Gujranwala District